Pius Olowo (born 21 June 1948) is a Ugandan sprinter. He competed in the men's 4 × 400 metres relay at the 1980 Summer Olympics.

References

1948 births
Living people
Athletes (track and field) at the 1974 British Commonwealth Games
Athletes (track and field) at the 1980 Summer Olympics
Ugandan male sprinters
Olympic athletes of Uganda
Place of birth missing (living people)
Commonwealth Games medallists in athletics
Commonwealth Games bronze medallists for Uganda
Medallists at the 1974 British Commonwealth Games